John Cubie Christie (12 July 1903 — 27 May 1978) was a Scottish first-class cricketer.

Christie was born at Edinburgh in July 1903, and was educated at the High School of Glasgow. A club cricketer for Glasgow High School Former Pupils, he made two appearances in first-class cricket for Scotland in 1923, against Ireland at Dublin and Wales at Perth. Playing as a bowler in the Scottish side, Christie took 6 wickets at an average of exactly 22, with best figures of 3 for 31. Outside of cricket, Christie was a coal merchant. He died in England at Wroxham in May 1978.

References

External links
 

1903 births
1978 deaths
Cricketers from Edinburgh
People educated at the High School of Glasgow
Scottish cricketers
Scottish merchants